Abdul Wahab Khar, also appears as Wahab Khar, was the 19th-century Kashmiri Sufi mystic poet and saint. He is sometimes referred to as "scholar" for his contribution to the literature of Kashmir. He was actively engaged in writing Sufi devotional poems and used to attend musical gatherings throughout his life. From the poetry's perspective, he is primarily known for his devotional poetic book titled Verses of Wahab Khar, comprising Kashmiri language poems which was later published by the Kashmir Jay Kay Books in 2007.

Biography 
Wahab was born around 1842. However, some news media have cited his birth as 1910. He had not received any formal education, but was believed to had psychological abilities and conceptual approach such as moral reasoning. After covering Sufism in his poetry, he was then regarded as a saint, and his Urs (death anniversary) is celebrated evey year in the month of April inside the premises of his dargah (Sufi shrine) at Pampore, Jammu and Kashmir. Besides Sufi Muslims, his shrine is frequently visited by the devotees from the different religious, including Christians, Sikhs and Hindus.

Wahab is claimed to "sprung out a hot water spring amid a forest on his own". The spring he sprung out still flows in the Kashmir Valley.

References

Notes

1842 births
1912 deaths
Sufi poets
Kashmiri poets
Poets from Jammu and Kashmir
Kashmiri Sufi saints